The MAAC Tournament Most Valuable Player was an annual award given out at the conclusion of the Metro Atlantic Athletic Conference men's ice hockey tournament to the most valuable player in the championship as voted by the coaches of each MAAC team.

The award was discontinued after 2003 when the MAAC ice hockey conference was dissolved and all remaining programs reformed in Atlantic Hockey.

Award winners

Winners by school

Winners by position

See also
Atlantic Hockey Most Valuable Player in Tournament
MAAC Awards

References

External links
2001-02 MAAC Regular Season Award Winners

College ice hockey trophies and awards in the United States